Parvathi Krishnan (15 March 1919 – 20 February 2014) was an Indian politician from the Communist Party of India. She was a three time former Member of Parliament representing Coimbatore Lok Sabha constituency and Rajya Sabha member. She was the daughter of former Madras Presidency Premier P. Subbarayan.

Early life

Parvathi was born on 15 March 1919 to P. Subbarayan and Radhabai Subbarayan.She did her schooling in C.S.I. Ewart Matriculation Higher Secondary School  She studied for her B. A. (Hons.) at St Hugh's College, University of Oxford and joined the Communist Party of India.

Electoral history
Parvathi contested for the Coimbatore Lok Sabha seat as a Communist Party of India candidate in the 1952 by-election (caused by the death of T. A. Ramalingam Chettiar). She was defeated by INC's N.M. Lingam. Later she was nominated to the Rajya Sabha on 3 April 1954 and served as a member of the Rajya Sabha till 12 March 1957. She was elected to the Lok Sabha from Coimbatore constituency as a Communist Party of India candidate in 1957 & 1977 general elections and the 1974 by-election. She lost the 1962 election to P. R. Ramakrishnan from Indian National Congress party, the 1980 election to Era Mohan from Dravida Munnetra Kazhagam party (contesting from Coimbatore) and the 1984 election to M. Thambi Durai of the Anna Dravida Munnetra Kazhagam party (contesting from Dharmapuri).

Family
She married N. K. Krishnan in December 1942. The couple have a daughter, Indira, and a granddaughter, Poornima.

References

External links
Official biographical sketch in Parliament of India website

Notes
 
 

1919 births
2014 deaths
Lok Sabha members from Tamil Nadu
Alumni of the University of Oxford
India MPs 1957–1962
India MPs 1962–1967
India MPs 1971–1977
India MPs 1977–1979
India MPs 1980–1984
India MPs 1984–1989
Women in Tamil Nadu politics
Kumaramangalam family
Communist Party of India politicians from Tamil Nadu
20th-century Indian women politicians
20th-century Indian politicians
Politicians from Coimbatore
Female politicians of the Communist Party of India